Stanisław Kamocki (1875–1944) was a Polish painter.

1875 births
1944 deaths
19th-century Polish painters
19th-century Polish male artists
20th-century Polish painters
20th-century Polish male artists
Polish male painters